¿Quién quiere ser millonario? (English: Who Wants to Be a Millionaire?) is a Salvadoran game show based on the British game show Who Wants to Be a Millionaire?. Hosted by Willie Maldonado, the aim of the game was to win US$200,000 by answering 15 multiple-choice questions of increasing difficulty correctly. ¿Quién quiere ser millonario? was broadcast from March 3, 2010 to November 24, 2010 on the Salvadoran Television Corporation's Channel 4. The Salvadoran version of the show offered the largest top prize of all the versions produced in Central America.

During the first series, aired from 3 March until 24 November 2010, 106 participants played in the Hot Seat, US$107,528.60 in prizes was given away with a total of 793 questions asked. During the second series, aired from March 2, 2011 until November 23 of that year, the show gave away US$104,867 in prizes to more than 100 participants.

On May 2, 2012 the third series premiered and ended in 2014.

Money tree

References

Who Wants to Be a Millionaire?
2010s Salvadoran television series
2010 Salvadoran television series debuts
2014 Salvadoran television series endings
Telecorporación Salvadoreña original programming